Who Looks for Gold? is a 1974 Czechoslovak film drama directed by Jiří Menzel. Filmed during the construction of the Dalešice Dam, it is one of Menzel's least well-regarded works. It concerns a young man (Jan Hrušínský) who works on the construction of a dam after his return from military service. The film was entered into the 25th Berlin International Film Festival.

Cast
 Jan Hrušínský
 Jana Giergielová
 Július Pántik
 Míla Myslíková
 Alois Liskutin
 František Husák
 František Řehák
 Blažena Holišová
 Vlasta Jelínková
 Blanka Lormanová
 Oldřich Vlach - Brother-in-law
 Otakar Dadák

References

External links
 

1974 films
Czechoslovak drama films
1970s Czech-language films
Films directed by Jiří Menzel
Czech drama films
Films with screenplays by Zdeněk Svěrák
1970s Czech films